is a railway station in Nara, Nara Prefecture, Japan.

Lines

Kintetsu Railway
Kyoto Line

Building
The station has two platforms serving four tracks.

Platforms

Around the station 
Sun Town Plaza Kosumosu-kan
Aeon Takanohara Shopping Center
Sun Town Plaza Suzuran-kan
Supermarket Kinsho
Sumitomo Mitsui Bank
Bank of Kyoto
Sun Town Plaza Himawari-kan
Nanto Bank
KEC Seminars
Nara University
Todaiji Junior high school & High school
Takanohara Central Hospital
Heijo High school
Hokubu Hall
Nanyo High school

History

 1972 - The station opens
 1999 - Promoted to southbound nighttime Limited Express stop.
 2005 - Start using the elevator
 2007 - Starts using PiTaPa

Adjacent stations

Railway stations in Japan opened in 1972
Railway stations in Nara Prefecture